Red durian may refer to several different species of durian:

Durio dulcis
Durio graveolens
Durio kutejensis